Field Marshal Philip Walhouse Chetwode, 1st Baron Chetwode, 7th Baronet of Oakley,  (21 September 1869 – 6 July 1950), was a senior British Army officer. He saw action during the Second Boer War, during which he was present at the Siege of Ladysmith in December 1899. He saw action again during World War I on the Western Front, taking part in the First Battle of Ypres, and then in the Sinai and Palestine campaign during which he led his corps at the First Battle of Gaza in March 1917, at the Battle of Beersheba in October 1917 and the Battle of Jerusalem in November 1917.

After the War he held a series of senior military appointments including Adjutant-General to the Forces and then Commander in Chief Aldershot Command. He went on to be Chief of the General Staff in India in 1928 and Commander in Chief in India in 1930 and was much concerned with the modernisation and "Indianisation" of the army in India.

Early life and education
Born the son of Sir George Chetwode, 6th Baronet, and Alice Jane Bass (daughter of Michael Thomas Bass the brewer), Chetwode was educated at Eton, where he was an athlete of some distinction, and entered the army through the Militia with his first commission being in the 3rd battalion the Oxfordshire and Buckinghamshire Light Infantry on 11 April 1888. He then received a regular commission with the 19th Hussars on 20 November 1889.

War service

Promoted to lieutenant on 6 August 1890, Chetwode first saw active service in the Chin Hills expedition in Burma from 1892 to 1893 and was promoted to captain on 7 February 1897. He served in the Second Boer War where he took part in the actions at Reitfontein in October 1899, Ladysmith in December 1899, Laing's Nek in June 1900 and Belfast in August 1900: he was twice mentioned in despatches and was awarded the Distinguished Service Order. Promoted to major on 21 December 1901, he stayed in South Africa until the end of hostilities. The war ended with the Peace of Vereeniging in late May 1902, and the following month Chetwode returned home in the SS Tagus, arriving at Southampton in July. He succeeded as 7th Baronet in 1905.

In 1906, Chetwode became assistant military secretary to Sir John French and on 3 January 1908 he was promoted to lieutenant-colonel on appointment as commanding officer of the 19th Hussars. Having been placed on half-pay list from 3 January 1912, he was promoted to colonel on 1 April 1912 and appointed Commander of the London Mounted Brigade.

During the Curragh incident in March 1914 Chetwode was offered command of the 3rd Cavalry Brigade when Hubert Gough threatened to resign. He knew that he would be "looked upon by all his brother officers as a scab” but thought it "his duty as a soldier to do as he was ordered & not to meddle in politics". In the event Gough kept his command and Chetwode remained with the London Mounted Brigade, but his willingness to replace Gough caused some ill feeling. Promoted to temporary brigadier-general on 15 May 1914, he was given command of the 5th Cavalry Brigade in August 1914.

In World War I, Chetwode served on the Western Front: his brigade helped cover the retreat from the frontier, and checked the pursuing Germans at Cerizy on 29 August 1914. After taking part in the First Battle of Ypres in October 1914, he was appointed General Officer Commanding 2nd Cavalry Division with promotion to temporary major-general on 15 July 1915 and to substantive major-general on 1 January 1916. With the war in Europe become bogged down in trench warfare, Chetwode was lucky to be transferred to the Palestine where he was given command of the Desert Column and promoted to temporary lieutenant general with effect from 22 November 1916. He led the corps at Rafa in January 1917 and at the First Battle of Gaza in March 1917. When Edmund Allenby took command of the Allied forces in Palestine in June 1917, Chetwode was promoted to command of XX Corps. He led his corps to military success at the Battle of Beersheba in October 1917 and at the Battle of Jerusalem in November 1917. During the Sinai and Palestine campaign he was mentioned in despatches eight times.

Service in India and after
After the war, and following promotion to the substantive rank of lieutenant-general on 1 January 1919, Chetwode was appointed to a number of senior military appointments serving as Military Secretary from 1919, Deputy Chief of the Imperial General Staff from October 1920, Adjutant-General to the Forces from September 1922 and Commander in Chief Aldershot Command from early 1923. He was promoted to full general on 1 June 1926.

Chetwode became Chief of the General Staff in India in 1928 and Commander-in-Chief, India, in November 1930. He was promoted to field marshal on 13 February 1933. In his tenure as Commander-in-Chief, India, Chetwode was an opponent of replacing horses with tanks; he "made the surprising pronouncement that the Army in India would be unlikely to adopt tanks for a very long time, and then only to keep up the momentum of horsed cavalry." He was much concerned with the modernisation and "Indianisation" of the army in India. The main building and its central hall at the Indian Military Academy is named after him. The credo of the Academy, engraved on the entrance to the central hall, is a passage from his address delivered at the formal inauguration of the Academy in 1932:  This is known as the "Chetwode Motto" and is the motto of the officers passing out from the Academy.

Chetwode returned from India in May 1934. He was Constable of the Tower from 1943 to 1948 and also President of the Royal Geographical Society as well as the recipient of an Honorary DCL from Oxford University. He had been appointed a deputy lieutenant of Buckinghamshire on 6 March 1919. He was created Baron Chetwode, of Chetwode in the County of Buckingham, on 10 July 1945 and died in London on 6 June 1950.

Family
Chetwode married Hester (Star) Alice Camilla Stapleton Cotton and had a son Roger and a daughter Penelope.
 Roger Chetwode married Honourable Molly Berry, daughter of the 1st Viscount Camrose. He was killed on active service on 14 August 1940 at age 34, leaving two sons: Philip, the 2nd Baron Chetwode, and Christopher.
 Honourable Penelope Chetwode married John Betjeman the poet (later Poet Laureate) and had a son Paul and daughter Candida Lycett Green.
Chetwode's sister Florence was married to General Noel Birch.

Honours and awards

British
DSO : Companion of the Distinguished Service Order – 20 November 1900 – for services during the operations in South Africa (Second Boer War)
KCMG : Knight Commander of the Order of St. Michael and St. George – 4 June 1917
GCB : Knight Grand Cross of the Order of the Bath (GCB) – 3 June 1929
KCB : Knight Companion of the Order of the Bath – 11 January 1918
CB : Companion of the Order of the Bath – 18 February 1915
KJStJ : Knight of Justice of the Venerable Order of St. John – 23 December 1930
GCSI : Knight Grand Commander of the Order of the Star of India – 4 June 1934
OM : Member of the Order of Merit – 1 January 1936

Foreign
Croix de guerre 1914–1918 (France) – 21 May 1917
Order of the Nile, 2nd Class (Egypt) – 9 November 1918

Notes

References

External links

|-

|-

|-

|-

|-

|-

1869 births
1950 deaths
Military personnel from London
People educated at Eton College
People from Westminster
British field marshals
British Commanders-in-Chief of India
British Army personnel of the Second Boer War
British Army cavalry generals of World War I
19th Royal Hussars officers
Oxfordshire and Buckinghamshire Light Infantry officers
Members of the Order of Merit
Bailiffs Grand Cross of the Order of St John
Knights Commander of the Order of St Michael and St George
Knights Grand Cross of the Order of the Bath
Knights Grand Commander of the Order of the Star of India
Commandeurs of the Légion d'honneur
Companions of the Distinguished Service Order
Recipients of the Croix de Guerre 1914–1918 (France)
Recipients of the Silver Cross of the Virtuti Militari
Recipients of the Order of the Sacred Treasure, 1st class
Deputy Lieutenants of Buckinghamshire
Constables of the Tower of London
Presidents of the Royal Geographical Society
Barons created by George VI
Members of the Council of the Governor General of India